Our Wife is a 1941 American romantic comedy film directed by John M. Stahl and starring Melvyn Douglas, Ruth Hussey and Ellen Drew. When a composer comes up with a hit, his ex-wife sets out to break up his romance with another woman and get him back.

Plot summary

Cast
 Melvyn Douglas as Jerome "Jerry" Marvin
 Ruth Hussey as Professor Susan Drake
 Ellen Drew as Babe Marvin
 Charles Coburn as Professor Drake
 John Hubbard as Tom Drake
 Harvey Stephens as Dr. Cassell
 Theresa Harris as Hattie
 Crauford Kent as Dr. Jenkins, Ship's Doctor
 Lawrence Grant as Dr. Holgarth 
 Edward Fielding as Dr. Mandel
 Lloyd Bridges as Taxicab Driver
 Betty Blythe as Shipboard Passenger 
 Hobart Cavanaugh as Shipboard Passenger 
 Grace Darmond as Shipboard Passenger
 Cyril Ring as Shipboard Passenger
 Martin Garralaga as Cuban Driver 
 Pedro Regas as Cuban Driver 
 Roland Varno as Steward
 Irving Bacon as 	Doorman 
 George Beranger as  Waiter

Reception
Bosley Crowther panned the film in The New York Times, writing, "the idea is one which would barely carry a ten-minute vaudeville skit. 'Our Wife' has grounds to sue its writers for non-support." He did praise Hussey and Douglas's performances, "considering that they have very little, or nothing, to do it with", but felt that Drew was "pleasant to look on but hard to take as the crafty wife".

References

Bibliography
  Babington, Bruce & Barr, Charles. The Call of the Heart: John M. Stahl and Hollywood Melodrama. Indiana University Press, 2018.

External links
 
 
 
 

1941 films
1941 romantic comedy films
American black-and-white films
American romantic comedy films
American films based on plays
Films directed by John M. Stahl
Columbia Pictures films
Films set in Panama
Films set on ships
1940s English-language films
1940s American films